α-Pyrrolidinobutiophenone (α-PBP) is a stimulant compound developed in the 1960s which has been reported as a novel designer drug. It can be thought of as the homologue lying between the two better known drugs α-PPP and α-PVP.

Legality

In the United States, it is a Schedule I controlled substance.

Sweden's public health agency suggested to classify α-PBP as hazardous substance on November 10, 2014.

As of October 2015 α-PBP is a controlled substance in China.

See also
 α-Pyrrolidinopropiophenone (α-PPP)
 α-Pyrrolidinopentiophenone (α-PVP)
 α-Pyrrolidinopentiothiophenone (α-PVT)
 α-Pyrrolidinohexiophenone (α-PHP)
 4'-Methyl-α-pyrrolidinobutiophenone (MPBP)
 3',4'-Methylenedioxy-α-pyrrolidinobutiophenone (MDPBP)
 Buphedrone

References

Designer drugs
Pyrrolidinophenones